Henry Irwin (1841–1922) was an architect in British India.

Henry Irwin may also refer to:
Henry Irwin (Archdeacon of Emly) (1773–1858), Irish Anglican priest
Henry Irwin (Archdeacon of Elphin) (died 1880), Irish Anglican priest, son of the above
Henry D. Irwin (fl. 1960), American Republican presidential elector
Henry Irwin (Canadian politician) (born 1925), MLA in New Brunswick